Marc Travanti is an American contemporary artist. His practice includes painting, sculpture, ceramics, photography, and video.

Early life and education

Travanti was born in 1956 in Kenosha, Wisconsin. He received a BFA from the University of Wisconsin–Whitewater and a MFA from the University of Colorado Boulder. He lives and works in New York and Wisconsin.

Career
Travanti’s art often involves some sort of duality. He has connected images of cell towers and early 20th century American sculpture; African masks and corporate logos; naked human bodies and stock market charts; and portraits of the living with renowned portraits from the distant past.  His art has both abstract and associative connotations. He arranges shapes and forms in rhythmical passages, with much attention paid to edge and direction. Emblematic or totemic compositions are often used,  particularly in his sculptural wall work. His art has been described as “modern artifacts; a combination of primal elements of simple organic shapes with a modern sensibility”. It has also been called perversely playful. His video work features cross-dissolves of his photographs and photocollages. His video entitled Entanglement, “shows male and female figures twined around each other in ways that evoke tantric sex, wrestling, and the incarnations of Hindu deities"

References

Year of birth missing (living people)
Living people
21st-century American photographers
People from Kenosha, Wisconsin
20th-century American photographers
Photographers from New York City
Photographers from Wisconsin
20th-century American painters
21st-century American painters
American male painters
Painters from Wisconsin
American contemporary painters
20th-century American sculptors
21st-century American sculptors
American male sculptors
Sculptors from Wisconsin
American video artists
University of Wisconsin–Whitewater alumni
University of Colorado Boulder alumni